Gabaldon is a surname. Notable people with the surname include:
Argimiro Gabaldon, poet and former Venezuelan revolutionary of FALN
Arnoldo Gabaldon, Venezuelan sanitarist
Arnoldo Gabaldon Berti, Venezuelan engineer, first Environment minister of Latin America
Diana Gabaldon, author of works including the "Outlander" and "Lord John" series
Guy Gabaldon, U.S. Marine, "Pied Piper of Saipan"
Isauro Gabaldon, Resident Commissioner from the Philippine Islands
Joaquín Gabaldón Márquez, Venezuelan writer and politician
José Rafael Gabaldón, Venezuelan andean caudillo
Paca Gabaldón, Spanish actress.
Tony Gabaldon, former Arizona state senator

See also
Gabaldon, Nueva Ecija, municipality in the Philippines
Gabaldon School Buildings, a collective term for heritage school buildings in the Philippines
Guy Gabaldon, USMC, semi-fluent in Japanese, awarded Navy Cross for valor at Saipan, 1944. "The Pied Piper of Saipan", on his own initiative convinced app.1,500 Japanese troops to surrender during combat operations, also acquiring in the process valuable intelligence that shortened the campaign, thereby saving Marine and Japanese lives.

Venezuela
 Arnoldo Gabaldón : one of seven parochs of Municipality of  Trujillo (Trujillo State) 
 Arnoldo Gabaldón : one of two  parochs of Municipality of  Campo Elías  (Trujillo State).